Siôn Ceri (fl. early 16th Century) was a Welsh language poet.  His bardic teacher was Tudur Aled and among his surviving work are poems to his patrons from north Powys.

Bibliography
 A. Cynfael Lake (ed.), Gwaith Siôn Ceri (Aberystwyth, 1996). The standard edition of his poems, in Welsh.

Welsh-language poets
16th-century Welsh poets
16th-century male writers
Year of death unknown
Year of birth unknown